Spank! is a 1999 Australian comedy film directed by Ernie Clark and starring Robert Mammone. It was filmed in Adelaide.

References

External links

Spank! at Urban Cinefile

Australian comedy films
Films set in South Australia
1990s English-language films
1990s Australian films